Erich Sauermann (7 December 1919 – 19 July 1984) was a German water polo player. He competed in the men's tournament at the 1952 Summer Olympics.

References

1919 births
1984 deaths
German male water polo players
Olympic water polo players of Germany
Water polo players at the 1952 Summer Olympics
Place of birth missing